Nicholas Peter Baldwin CBE FIMechE FIET (born 17 December 1952) is a British businessman, and the Chairman of the Office for Nuclear Regulation, and a former Chief Executive of Powergen (E.ON UK since July 2004)

Early life
He was born in Gosport.

He gained a BSc in Mechanical Engineering from City University (now City, University of London), studying from 1971 to 1975. He later gained an MSc in Economics from Birkbeck College.

Career

Powergen
He joined Powergen in 1989. From 2001 to 2002 he was Chief Executive of Powergen. Powergen was sold to E.ON of Germany for £9.6bn, completed in January 2002. The UK business of National Power was bought by RWE for £3.1bn in 2000.

Nuclear Decommissioning Authority
He was Interim Chairman from 2007-08 of the Nuclear Decommissioning Authority. He worked there from 2004 to 2011.

Office for Nuclear Regulation
He became Chairman of the Office for Nuclear Regulation in 2011. The ONR became an independent public organisation in April 2014.

Baldwin was appointed Commander of the Order of the British Empire (CBE) in the 2017 Birthday Honours for services to nuclear safety and security and to the charitable sector.

He was replaced in the role by Mark McAllister on the 1 April 2019.

Personal life
He married Adrienne Plunkett in March 2002 in Evesham. They have a son and daughter. He lives in Worcester. In September 2000 he was hit by lightning, and suffered serious burns and head injuries, whilst sheltering under a tree at Bryce Canyon National Park in Utah, when on a horse-riding holiday; he was taken to hospital in Salt Lake City, where he was in intensive care for three days. A lightning bolt can carry up to one million volts in electricity. He was with his wife and two children at the time, and has no memory of the incident, and for two days after that.

See also
 Nuclear power in the United Kingdom
 Wulf Bernotat, former Chief Executive of E.ON (in Essen), and former Chairman of Powergen

References

External links
 ONR

1952 births
Alumni of Birkbeck, University of London
Alumni of City, University of London
British chief executives in the energy industry
Businesspeople in nuclear power
E.ON
Fellows of the Institution of Engineering and Technology
Fellows of the Institution of Mechanical Engineers
Injuries from lightning strikes
Nuclear energy in the United Kingdom
People from Gosport
Business people from Worcester, England
Living people
Commanders of the Order of the British Empire